Simone Vergassola (born 24 January 1976) is an Italian former footballer who played as a midfielder who played for Serie D side Siena.

External links
Gazzetta dello Sports player profile 

1976 births
Living people
People from La Spezia
Italian footballers
Association football midfielders
Carrarese Calcio players
U.C. Sampdoria players
Torino F.C. players
A.C.N. Siena 1904 players
Serie A players
Serie B players
Footballers from Liguria
Sportspeople from the Province of La Spezia